Ivica Jozić (born 22 July 1969) is a Bosnian-Herzegovinian former professional footballer who played as a midfielder. He spent most of his career in Germany.

International career
Jozić earned one cap for the Bosnia and Herzegovina national team, playing the full match in a 0–0 draw against Albania on 24 April 1996 in Zenica.

References

External links

Profile at FC Antwerp 

1969 births
Living people
Sportspeople from Mostar
Yugoslav footballers
Bosnia and Herzegovina footballers
Association football midfielders
Bosnia and Herzegovina international footballers
FK Sarajevo players
STV Horst-Emscher players
FC Schalke 04 II players
SG Wattenscheid 09 players
VfL Wolfsburg players
Royal Antwerp F.C. players
K.S.V. Waregem players
Rot-Weiss Essen players
BV Cloppenburg players
VfB Oldenburg players
SV Wilhelmshaven players
Yugoslav First League players
Oberliga (football) players
Bundesliga players
2. Bundesliga players
Belgian Pro League players
Challenger Pro League players
Regionalliga players
Yugoslav expatriate footballers
Bosnia and Herzegovina expatriate footballers
Expatriate footballers in Germany
Yugoslav expatriate sportspeople in Germany
Bosnia and Herzegovina expatriate sportspeople in Germany
Expatriate footballers in Belgium
Bosnia and Herzegovina expatriate sportspeople in Belgium